Unpaved roads may refer to:
 Dirt roads
 Gravel roads